William T. Martin (April 6, 1788 – February 19, 1866) was the fifth mayor of Columbus, Ohio.  He was appointed by the Burough Council of Columbus in 1824 and served Columbus for three consecutive terms.  His successor was Philo H. Olmsted.  He died on February 19, 1866, and is interred in Green Lawn Cemetery.

Works 
(1838) Franklin County Register
(1858) History of Franklin County: A Collection of Reminiscences of the Early Settlement of the County; with Biographical Sketches and a Complete History of the County to the Present Time.

References

Bibliography

External links 

William T. Martin at Political Graveyard

Mayors of Columbus, Ohio
Columbus City Council members
1788 births
1866 deaths
Burials at Green Lawn Cemetery (Columbus, Ohio)
People from Bedford County, Pennsylvania
19th-century American politicians